Final Approach is a 1991 American thriller film.

The SR-71 Blackbird spy plane is featured in the film. Final Approach was the first film to be originally recorded, mixed and mastered in pure digital sound.

Plot 
Final Approach deals with the mental condition of amnesia when a stealth test pilot, Col. Jason Halsey (James Sikking), is involved in an air disaster. A psychiatrist Dr. Dio Gottlieb (Hector Elizondo) attempts to help Halsey to recover his memory, but his motives seem suspect. Is Gottlieb giving professional help or is he a counter-intelligence agent sent to debrief Halsey?

Cast 
 James Sikking as Col. Jason Halsey
 Hector Elizondo as Dr. Dio Gottlieb
 Madolyn Smith as Casey Halsey
 Kevin McCarthy as Gen. Geller
 Cameo Kneuer as Brooke Halsey
 Wayne Duvall as Doug Slessinger

References

External links 
 
 
 

American science fiction thriller films
American aviation films
1991 films
1990s science fiction thriller films
Films directed by Eric Steven Stahl
1990s English-language films
1990s American films